Mushroomhead is the debut album from heavy metal band Mushroomhead. It was released independently in Cleveland, Ohio, United States in 1995. Some songs have been remastered on XX. Many of the songs contain samples from movies. This is the only album to feature the original line-up, as member Mr. Murdernickel would leave the band after the album's release, although he has songwriting credits on a few tracks on the next album. The album was re-pressed in 2002 along with Superbuick and M3 with alternate artwork, though some major retailers do not carry them. In 2001, the album had sold over 47,000 copies, a considerable number for an album not available in most chain stores and retail markets.

Track listing

Tracks 14 through 42 are silent and last four or five seconds each. The untitled 12-minute hidden bonus track is a blend of clips of songs throughout the album, "Too Much Nothing," "Indifferent," "2nd Thoughts," "Mommy" and "43." They are separated by the intro featured in "Slow Thing" which is played in different pitches and manipulations.

Film samples
The movie samples are cited in the CD booklet:
 Reefer Madness (Misspelled as "Refer madness" in the booklet)
 Twin Peaks: Fire Walk with Me
 The Barretta Theme
 Hotel Room
 Reservoir Dogs
 Stand by Me
 Lean on Me
 Moscow on the Hudson
 The Silence of the Lambs
 Pet Sematary
 Closetland
 Wayne's World
 One Flew Over the Cuckoo's Nest (Misspelled as "Coo-coo's" in the booklet)
 The Texas Chainsaw Massacre

Credits

Mushroomhead
 Jeffrey Hatrix - clean vocals
 Jason Popson - harsh vocals
 John Sekula - guitars
 Richie Moore - guitars
 Joe Kilcoyne - bass
 Tom Schmitz - keyboards
 Joe Lenkey - samples, programming
 Steve Felton - drums, percussion

Guest
 Mandy Lascko - lead vocals on "Mommy"

Technical
 Steve Felton - production
 Jeffrey Hatrix - lyrics
 Jason Popson - lyrics

References 

Mushroomhead albums
1995 debut albums